Franklin is a town in Kewaunee County, Wisconsin, United States. The population was 993 at the 2010 census. The unincorporated communities of Bolt, Curran, and Stangelville are in the town.

Geography
Franklin is in the southwest corner of Kewaunee County. It is bordered to the west by Brown County and to the south by Manitowoc County.

Demographics
As of the census of 2000, there were 997 people, 338 households, and 270 families residing in the town. The population density was 28.1 people per square mile (10.8/km2). There were 359 housing units at an average density of 10.1 per square mile (3.9/km2). The racial makeup of the town was 99.20% White, 0.30% African American, 0.30% Asian, 0.10% from other races, and 0.10% from two or more races. Hispanic or Latino of any race were 0.60% of the population.

There were 338 households, out of which 38.5% had children under the age of 18 living with them, 67.8% were married couples living together, 6.5% had a female householder with no husband present, and 20.1% were non-families. 14.8% of all households were made up of individuals, and 6.5% had someone living alone who was 65 years of age or older. The average household size was 2.95 and the average family size was 3.30.

In the town, the population was spread out, with 28.6% under the age of 18, 7.8% from 18 to 24, 29.0% from 25 to 44, 24.7% from 45 to 64, and 9.9% who were 65 years of age or older. The median age was 36 years. For every 100 females, there were 112.6 males. For every 100 females age 18 and over, there were 117.1 males.

The median income for a household in the town was $52,019, and the median income for a family was $57,212. Males had a median income of $33,958 versus $22,237 for females. The per capita income for the town was $19,401. About 2.2% of families and 2.4% of the population were below the poverty line, including none of those under age 18 and 4.0% of those age 65 or over.

Notable people
Anton Holly, Wisconsin state representative, born in Franklin
Paul Hoverson, Wisconsin state representative, born in Franklin
Thomas F. Konop, member of the United States House of Representatives, born in Franklin
William H. O'Brien, Wisconsin state representative, born in Franklin

References

External links
Official website

Towns in Kewaunee County, Wisconsin
Green Bay metropolitan area
Towns in Wisconsin